Max Britzelmayr (7 January 1839 – 6 December 1909) was a German mycologist and lichenologist who was a native of Augsburg.

He spent his career as a schoolteacher and Kreisschulinspektor (school district administrator) in Augsburg. He is known for his research of a class of fungi known as Hymenomycetes. He also conducted investigations of lichens native to southern Bavaria, including the Allgäu Alps.

List of Publications 
 Dermini und Melanospori aus Südbayern, (Dermini and Melanspora of southern Bavaria); (1883)
 Hymenomyceten aus Südbayern, (Hymenomycetes of southern Bavaria); (1894)
 Zur Hymenomyceten-Kunde, (Study of Hymenomycetes); (1895)
 Materialien zur Beschreibung der Hymenomyceten, (Materials for the description of Hymenomycetes); (1897). Botanisches Zentralblatt 71: 49–59, 87–96.
 Die Lichenen der Allgäuer Alpen. (Lichens of the Allgäu Alps); (1900), Bericht der Naturwissenschaftlichen Vereins für Schwaben und Neuburg (A. V.) in Augsburg 34: 73–139.

See also 
 :Category:Taxa named by Max Britzelmayr

References 
 Pilzverein Augsburg Königsbrunn (translated biography of Max Britzelmayr)
 Records from the Cyberliber bibliographic database

German mycologists
German lichenologists
Scientists from Augsburg
1839 births
1909 deaths